Mirșid is a commune located in Sălaj County, Crișana, Romania. It is composed of four villages: Firminiș (Fürményes), Mirșid, Moigrad-Porolissum (until 1996 Moigrad; Mojgrád) and Popeni (Szilágypaptelek).

Sights 
 Porolissum Roman fortification, historic monument

See also 
 Porolissum

References

Communes in Sălaj County
Localities in Crișana